The Van Siclen Avenue station is a station on the IRT New Lots Line of the New York City Subway, located at the intersection of Van Siclen Avenue and Livonia Avenue in East New York, Brooklyn. It is served by the 3 train at all times except late nights, when the 4 train takes over service. During rush hours, occasional 2, 4 and 5 trains also stop here.

History 
The New Lots Line was built as a part of Contract 3 of the Dual Contracts between New York City and the Interborough Rapid Transit Company, including this station. It was built as an elevated line because the ground in this area is right above the water table, and as a result the construction of a subway would have been prohibitively expensive. The first portion of the line between Utica Avenue and Junius Street opened on November 22, 1920, with shuttle trains operating over this route. The line opened one more stop farther to the east to Pennsylvania Avenue on December 24, 1920. At that date, only the southbound platform was used.

While work at this station and at New Lots Avenue was practically completed in 1921, they could not open yet because trains could not run to the terminal until track work, the signal tower, and the compressor room were in service. Work began on June 19, 1922, and this station opened on October 16, 1922 when shuttles started operating between Pennsylvania Avenue and New Lots Avenue. A two-car train operated on a single track on the northbound track. On October 31, 1924, through service to New Lots Avenue was begun.

From April 20, 2015 to March 28, 2016, this station and Rockaway Avenue were closed for renovations.

Station layout

This elevated station has two side platforms and two tracks with space for a center track that was never installed. Here, they have waist-high, steel fences with lampposts at regular intervals. The station's signs are the standard black name plates with white Helvetica lettering.

Exits
The station's only mezzanine is an elevated headhouse below the platforms and tracks at the extreme east (railroad south) end. A single staircase from each platform goes down to a waiting area/crossover, where a turnstile bank provides access to and from the station. Outside fare control, there is a token booth and two staircases going down the northwest and southeast corners of Livonia Avenue and Van Siclen Avenue.

References

External links 
 
 
 Station Reporter — 3 Train

IRT New Lots Line stations
East New York, Brooklyn
New York City Subway stations in Brooklyn
Railway stations in the United States opened in 1922